Greville Verney, 7th Baron Willoughby de Broke and de jure 15th Baron Latimer (1586 – 12 May 1642) of Compton Verney in Warwickshire, England, served twice as a Member of Parliament for Warwick, in 1614 and 1621.

Origins
He was the son and heir of Sir Richard Verney (1563–1630) of Compton Verney by his wife Margaret Greville (d. 1631), (from 1628 suo jure 6th Baroness Willoughby de Broke) daughter of Fulke Greville, 4th Baron Willoughby de Broke (1536–1606) of Beauchamp Court, Alcester, Warwickshire, and sister and heiress of Fulke Greville, 1st Baron Brooke, 5th Baron Willoughby de Broke (1554–1628), known before 1621 as Sir Fulke Greville the poet, dramatist, and statesman.

Career
In 1614 he was elected a Member of Parliament for Warwick and was re-elected in 1621. He inherited the titles Baron Willoughby de Broke and Baron Latimer on the death of his mother in 1631. He was appointed Sheriff of Warwickshire for 1635.

Marriage and issue
On 13 May 1618, he married Katherine Southwell, a daughter of Sir  Richard Southwell (d. 1598) by his wife Elizabeth Howard, a daughter of Charles Howard, 1st Earl of Nottingham. By his wife he had issue including:
Greville Verney, 8th Baron Willoughby de Broke (c. 1620–1648), eldest son and heir.
Elizabeth Verney, who married William Peyto, a son of Edward Peyto

Death and succession
He died on 12 May 1642 when the title passed to his son Greville Verney, 8th Baron Willoughby de Broke.

References

External links
 Compton Verney House website

Greville
Greville Verney
1586 births
1642 deaths
High Sheriffs of Warwickshire
English MPs 1614
English MPs 1621–1622
Sheriffs of Warwickshire
7